Trans-Atlantic trade is different from Trans-Atlantic slave trade it simply means the integration of African, Asian and Latin American economies to European economy through the medium of transnational corporations in the 19th and 20th century. In many parts of the world this trade has considerably weakened many historic long distance trade like the famous Silk road trade in Asia trade or Trans-Sahara trade routes in Africa. Most of the products traded in Trans-Atlantic were made in Europe. The transnational corporations based in developing countries created distribution channels of finished products. Trans-Atlantic trade also include export of raw material to Europe for manufacturing purposes.

History of international trade